Sumangali is an Indian Tamil-language drama starring Aishwarya, Pradeep (replaced by Sujeeth) and Akshitha Bopiah. It was produced by Sathya Jyothi Films and directed by K. Vetrimani.

Plot 
Anu (Aishwarya) is a poor, free-minded girl who will do anything for people who are right and handles all relations. Santhosh (Sujeeth) a rich business man who is self-centered, haughty and arrogant. At their first meeting he hates Anu. Their lives take a new turn as husband and wife. After marriage, the story is how they both live together.

Cast 
Main
 Aishwarya Ramsai as Anu Santhosh / Raja Rajeswari, Santhosh's wife
 Sujeeth as Santhosh, Anu's husband
 Akshitha Boopaiah as Nithya Duraipandi, Santhosh's ex-lover

Recurring
 Ashwin Kumar as Selvam, Renuka Devi's housekeeper.
 Sugunya as Charu, Anu's cousin
 Sri Vidhya Shankar as Nagamma, Anu's foster mother and Nithya's biological mother.
 Deepa Netran as Parvathi, Santhosh mother
 Ilavarasan as Vedhanayagam, Santhosh father
 Purusothaman as Barani, Anu's cousin
 Navin Kumar as Mani,  Anu's uncle
 Sathish as Kumar, Anu's foster brotheramd Nagamma's son
 K. Veera as Rajalingam, Anu's uncle.
 Uma Rani as Meenakshi Sankarapandi, Nithya's mother-in-law.
 Santhosh as Muthupandi, Sankarapandi's 2nd son.
 Syamantha Kiran as Vasanthi, Muthupandi's crush and Kamakshi's daughter.
 Veena Venkatesh as Renuka Devi, Anu's aunt.
 Akila as Bhanu, Renuka Devi's daughter-in-law.
 Srilatha as Kamakshi, Vedhanayagam's sister.
 Vaani as Nithya's grandmother
 Jenifer Rechaal as Devi, Anu's worker

Former
 Divya Ganesh as Anu Santhosh / Raja Rajeswari, Santhosh's wife (Replaced by Aishwarya).
 Pradeep as Santhosh, Anu's husband (Replaced by Sujeeth).
 Varshini Arza as Nithya Duraipandi (Replaced by Akshitha Bopaiah).

Casting 
 Actress Divya Ganesh landed of Anu
 Later on Aishwarya was replaced  for the role of Anu.
 Actor Pradeep  was selected to portray the lead role of Shanthosh, 
 Later Kannada TV Actor Sujeeth was replaced role of Santhosh.
 Actress Varshini Arza was selected to portray the second lead role of Nithya. Later her character was replaced by Akshitha Bopaiah.
 Actor Ilavarasan was selected to the role of Vedhanayagam (Santhosh Father) and Deepa Nethran was selected to the role of Parvathi (Santhosh Mother) Gemini is joined as Sankarapandi role playing as calm and sadistic villain.
 Divya Ganesh As Anu (Later Replaced By Aishwarya)

Production 
The series was directed by K.Shiva. It was produced by Sathya Jyothi Films, along with the production crew of 2001–2012 Sun TV Serials Gopuram (2001–2002), Varam (2002–2003), Anandham (2003–2009), Kalyanam (2009), Idhayam (2009–2012) and Aan Paavam (2012).

References

External links 
 Official Website 

Sun TV original programming
2010s Tamil-language television series
2017 Tamil-language television series debuts
Tamil-language television shows
2019 Tamil-language television series endings